The Boston mayoral election of 1901 occurred on Tuesday, December 10, 1901. Democratic candidate Patrick Collins defeated Republican candidate and incumbent Mayor of Boston Thomas N. Hart, and two other contenders.

Collins was inaugurated on Monday, January 6, 1902.

Candidates
 Patrick Collins (Democrat), former member of the United States House of Representatives (1883–1889), Massachusetts Senate (1870–1871), and Massachusetts House of Representatives (1868–1869)
 Thomas N. Hart (Republican), Mayor of Boston since 1900, former Mayor of Boston (1889–1890), Postmaster of Boston (1891–1895), member of the Boston Board of Aldermen (1882–1886), and member of the Boston Common Council (1879–1881)
 Herman W. A. Raasch (Socialist Labor)
 John Weaver Sherman (Socialist)

Party conventions
The Republican convention was held on November 19, 1901, at Association Hall. Incumbent Thomas N. Hart was renominated by acclamation.

The Democratic convention was held on November 20, 1901, at Steinert Hall. Patrick Collins unanimously won the party's nomination for Mayor.

Results

See also
List of mayors of Boston, Massachusetts

References

Further reading
 

1901
Boston
Boston mayoral
1900s in Boston